Ishigaki may refer to:

 Ishigaki Island, a Japanese island southwest of Okinawa
 Ishigaki, Okinawa, city
 Ishigaki Airport
 Japanese escort Ishigaki, World War II era ship of the Japanese Navy
 10179 Ishigaki, main-belt asteroid

People with the surname
Ai Ishigaki (born 1970), Japanese guitarist
, Japanese-born American journalist
Eitaro Ishigaki (1893–1958), Japanese-born American artist
Hirofumi Ishigaki (born 1963), Japanese actor
Hitoshi Ishigaki (born 1953), Japanese boxer
Kuraji Ishigaki (1880–1942), Japanese politician
, Japanese curler
Ishigaki Rin (1920–2004), Japanese poet
Ryuya Ishigaki, Japanese curler
, Japanese table tennis player
Yuma Ishigaki (born 1982), Japanese actor

See also
Iriomote-Ishigaki National Park, a park near the island above

Japanese-language surnames